Border Wars is a collaboration album between American rappers Berner and The Jacka. The album includes guest appearances from Rappin'-4-Tay, San Quinn, Liqz and Messy Marv.

Track listing

References

Collaborative albums
2012 albums
The Jacka albums